Dmitry Golubev may refer to:
Dmitri Andreyevich Golubev (b. 1985), Russian footballer most notably with FC Shinnik Yaroslavl
Dmitry Pavlovich Golubev (1906–1991), Russian surgeon
Dmitri Vadimovich Golubev (b. 1992), Russian footballer with FC Krylia Sovetov Samara
Dmitri Vasilyevich Golubev (b. 1971), Russian football coach and former player
Dmitry Golubev (Belarusian footballer), Belarusian footballer